The Thayer House at 109 Jefferson St. in Thompson Falls in Sanders County, Montana was home of Arthur W. Thayer, a mining entrepreneur and editor of the Sanders County Ledger.  The stone house, built in 1907, was described as "The most portentious residence in Thompson" by the Ledger.  It is "French southern Colonial" in style and was listed on the National Register of Historic Places in 1986.

It was built of stone from Thayer's quarry on the Thompson River, with the stone brought during the winter by teamster Eugene Preston by two four-horse sleighs.

References

Houses on the National Register of Historic Places in Montana
Houses completed in 1907
National Register of Historic Places in Sanders County, Montana
1907 establishments in Montana
Thompson Falls, Montana